This order of battle lists the Soviet and German forces involved in the Battle of the Korsun–Cherkassy Pocket in January–February 1944.

Soviet

German

References
Soviet: Soviet General Staff Official Orders of Battle for January and February 1944. (Combat composition of the Soviet Army)

World War II orders of battle